This article lists the administrators of the French protectorate of Cambodia, and also encompass the Japanese occupation of Cambodia.

(Dates in italics indicate de facto continuation of office)

See also
History of Cambodia

External links
World Statesmen – Cambodia

French protectorate of Cambodia
Cambodia
Lists of office-holders in Cambodia